In the United States, life imprisonment is amongst the most severe punishments provided by law, depending on the state, and second only to the death penalty. According to a 2013 study, 1 of every 20,000 inhabitants of the U.S. were imprisoned for life . Many U.S. states can release a convict on parole after a decade or more has passed, but in California, people sentenced to life imprisonment can normally apply for parole after seven years.
The laws in the United States categorize life sentences as "determinate life sentences" or "indeterminate life sentences," the latter indicating the possibility of an abridged sentence, usually through the process of parole. For example, sentences of "15 years to life," "25 years to life," or "life with mercy" are called "indeterminate life sentences", while a sentence of "life without the possibility of parole" or "life without mercy" is called a "determinate life sentence". The potential for parole is not assured but discretionary, making it an indeterminate sentence. Even if a sentence explicitly denies the possibility of parole, government officials may have the power to grant an amnesty to reprieve, or to commute a sentence to time served.

History
In the 1861, reformation became favored over penitence in American penology, with the role of prisons seen as reforming prisoners, who were imprisoned until reform was achieved.  The concepts of parole and indeterminate sentencing were regarded as forward-looking in the 1870s. The initial concept of parole came from the idea that prisoners began their path to rehabilitation during their sentence, and their successful rehabilitation could be recognizable by a parole board. The importance was placed on eradicating crime and having prisoners deemed ready to enter society as soon as possible. However, the ideals were not as successful as had been hoped.  Crime was not eradicated, reformatories had the same problems as prisons on politicization and underfunding, and indeterminate sentencing became undermined by prisoners, who quickly found that it was possible to "beat the system" by pretense to get a better chance of winning parole.  Many were soon back in custody.  Similarly, prison authorities could twist it to their advantage by using those granted parole or probation to spy on and actively help to imprison other people, or sometimes by selectively denying parole.  However, the biggest cause of the reformatories' failure to live up to expectations was that despite the enthusiasm of reformers and Zebulon Brockway's call for an end to vengeance in criminal justice, those within the prison environment, both inmates and guards alike, continued to conceive of prison as a place of retribution.

Schick's case and life imprisonment without parole
In 1954 (November 28), Master Sergeant Maurice L. Schick was convicted by military court-martial of the murder of nine-year-old Susan Rothschild at Camp Zama in Japan (Tokyo). The soldier admitted the killing stating he had a sudden "uncontrollable urge to kill something quickly and quietly” and had chosen his victim "just because she was there."

Schick was sentenced to death. Six years later, the case was forwarded to President Dwight Eisenhower for final review. He exercised his right of executive clemency to commute Schick's death sentence to confinement with hard labor for the term of his natural life, with the express condition that he "shall never have any rights, privileges, claims or benefits arising under the parole and suspension or remission of sentence laws of the United States."

In 1971, Schick began a legal challenge against his whole life sentence. The appeal eventually reached the U.S. Supreme Court in 1974. It examined the constitutional basis of the punishment: life imprisonment without parole. Had Schick been given an ordinary life sentence, he would have been eligible for parole in 1969.

Although Schick's sentence was given only cursory mention, the court concluded a whole life sentence was constitutional. Schick, together with only five other federal prisoners who were still ineligible for parole at the time, was made eligible for parole by a separate pardon from President Gerald Ford in 1976 or 1977, and he may have died a free man in Palm Beach, Florida, in 2004.

Despite the Schick opinion's lack of thorough analysis on life imprisonment without a chance of parole, an imposing amount of precedent has developed based upon it. After Furman v. Georgia, the constitutionality of the death penalty in question as life imprisonment without parole received increased attention from lawmakers and judges, as an alternative to the death penalty.

Such penalties predate Schick. One early American case was Ex parte Wells (1856); Wells was convicted of murder in 1851 and sentenced to be hanged. On the day of his execution, President Millard Fillmore gave him a conditional pardon commuting his sentence to "imprisonment for life in the penitentiary at Washington." Wells appealed the conditions of his pardon, but the sentence was upheld with no discussion by the majority of the purpose of the substituted punishment.

Minors

A few countries worldwide have allowed for minors to be given lifetime sentences that have no provision for eventual release. Countries that allow life imprisonment without a possibility of parole for juveniles include Antigua and Barbuda, Cuba, Dominica, Israel, Nigeria, Saint Vincent and the Grenadines, the Solomon Islands, Sri Lanka, Tanzania and the United States. Of these, only the U.S. currently has minors serving such sentences. The University of San Francisco School of Law’s Center for Law & Global Justice conducted international research on the use of the sentence of life without parole for juveniles, and has found no cases outside the U.S. in which the sentence is actually imposed on juveniles. As of 2009, Human Rights Watch has calculated that there are 2,589 youth offenders serving life without parole in the U.S.

In the U.S, juvenile offenders started to get life without parole sentences more frequently in the 1990s due to John J. DiIulio Jr’s. Teenage Superpredator Theory.

In 2010, in the U.S. Supreme Court ruled that sentencing minors to automatic sentences of life without a chance of parole for crimes other than those involving a homicide (generally, first-degree murder, and usually with aggravating factors or accompanying felonies) violated the Eighth Amendment's ban on "cruel and unusual punishments", in the case of Graham v. Florida. In finding that the U.S. Constitution prohibits as cruel and unusual punishment a life without parole sentence for a juvenile in a non-homicide case, the U.S. Supreme Court stated that "the overwhelming weight of international opinion against" juvenile life without a chance of parole "provide[s] respected and significant confirmation for our own conclusions". In 2012, in the Case of Miller v. Alabama, the Court considered whether to ban the automatic use of it completely as a sentence for minors. The Court had already judged the death penalty unconstitutional for minors in 2005. In June 2012, the Court ruled that it could never be automatically used as a sentence for a minor (under 18), although the Court left room for it as a sentence that can eventually be given (for now) in certain first-degree murder cases once the judge has taken mitigating circumstances and other factors into account.
The U.S. practice of sentencing juveniles to life imprisonment without a possibility of parole violates international standards of justice, as well as treaties to which the U.S. is a party. Each state must ensure that its criminal punishments comply with the United States' international treaty obligations:
 The International Covenant on Civil and Political Rights; the oversight Committee instructed the U.S. to: "ensure that no such child offender is sentenced to life without parole [and] adopt all appropriate measures to review the situation of persons already serving such sentences".
 The United Nations Convention Against Torture; the oversight Committee warned the U.S. that juvenile life sentences without a possibility of parole could constitute "cruel, inhuman or degrading treatment or punishment" for youth.
 The oversight body of the Committee on the Elimination of Racial Discrimination found that juvenile life without a chance of parole is applied disproportionately to black minors, and the U.S. has done nothing to reduce what has become pervasive discrimination. The Committee recommended that the U.S. discontinue the use of this sentence against persons under the age of eighteen at the time the offense was committed, and review the situation of persons already serving such sentences and in 2016, in the case of Montgomery v. Louisiana, the Supreme Court ruled that Miller v. Alabama was to be applied retroactively to offenders convicted before 2012.

The United Nations General Assembly has called upon governments to: "abolish by law, as soon as possible...life imprisonment without possibility of release for those below the age of 18 years at the time of the commission of the offense".

International standards of justice hold that a juvenile life imprisonment without a possibility of parole is not warranted under any circumstances because juvenile offenders lack the experience, education, intelligence and mental development of adults and must be given a reasonable opportunity to obtain release based on demonstrated maturity and rehabilitation.

By March 2023, 27 states and the District of Columbia have completely banned life without parole sentences for all juvenile offenders while five states have not banned the sentence but do not have any juvenile offenders serving life without parole.

Use
Although sentences vary for each state, life imprisonment is generally mandatory for first-degree murder, particularly if it is done during the commission of another felony (the felony murder rule), or there are other aggravating circumstances present (such as rapes before such murders or for murder of any law enforcement official or other public servant) in all 50 states and the District of Columbia, including states without the death penalty, and as one or the only alternative sentence in states that have the death penalty and in federal and military courts. Life imprisonment is also a mandatory punishment in Idaho for aircraft hijacking, in New York State for terrorism, in Florida for capital sexual battery (sexual abuse of a child under 12 that causes injury to the child) and in Georgia for a second conviction for armed robbery, kidnapping, or rape and other serious violent felonies under Georgia's seven-deadly-sins law.  Life imprisonment is a possibility for aggravated mayhem and torture in California. Life imprisonment is mandatory for kidnapping in Nebraska. Other specifics about life sentences in the United States continue to vary widely by individual states.

In addition, the sentence of life imprisonment may also be given for "drug kingpins" and "habitual criminals." It has been applied in every state except Alaska, as well as in the federal courts. In Alaska, the maximum term of imprisonment is for 99 years, but that is almost always considered to be a practical life sentence as a sentence of 99 years' imprisonment, especially without parole, generally lasts beyond a normal lifespan.

Statistics 
Over 200,000 people, or about 1 in 7 prisoners in the United States, were serving life or virtual life sentences in 2019. Over 50,000 are serving life without a chance of parole. In 1993, the Times survey found, about 20 percent of all lifers had no chance of parole. By 2004, that had risen to 28 percent.

As a result, the U.S. is now housing by far the world's largest and most permanent population of prisoners who are guaranteed to die behind bars. At the Louisiana State Penitentiary, for instance, more than 3,000 of the 5,100 prisoners are serving life with a chance of parole, and most of the remaining 2,100 are serving sentences so long that they cannot be completed in a typical lifetime. About 150 inmates have died there in the time period between the years of 2000 and 2005. The United States holds 40% of the world’s prisoners with life sentences, more than in any other country.

Parole and nonviolent offenses
Under the federal criminal code, however, with respect to offenses committed after December 1, 1987, parole has been abolished for all sentences handed down by the federal system, including life sentences. A life sentence from a federal court will therefore result in imprisonment for the life of the defendant unless a pardon or reprieve is granted by the President or if, upon appeal, the conviction is quashed.

In the states of Illinois, Iowa, Louisiana, Maine, Pennsylvania, and South Dakota, all life sentences are issued without the possibility of parole. 

Over 3,200 people nationwide are serving life terms without a chance of parole for nonviolent offenses. Of those prisoners, 80 percent are behind bars for drug-related convictions: 65 percent are African-American, 18 percent are Latino, and 16 percent are white. The ACLU has called the statistics proof of "extreme racial disparities." Some of the crimes that led to life sentences include stealing gas from a truck and shoplifting but only for those with a pattern of habitual criminal offenses. A large number of those imprisoned for life had no prior criminal history but were given the sentence because of the aggravated nature of their crimes.

Three-strikes law

Under some controversial sentencing guidelines known as "three-strikes laws," existing both at state and federal level, a person who is convicted of an offense and who has one or two other previous serious convictions is to serve a mandatory or discretionary life sentence in prison, with or without parole depending on the jurisdiction. Notably, a broad range of crimes ranging from petty theft to murder could served as the trigger for a mandatory or discretionary life sentence in California from 1994 to 2012. Notably, the U.S. Supreme Court has on several occasions upheld lengthy sentences for petty theft including life with the possibility of parole and 50 years to life and stated that neither sentence conflicted with the ban on "cruel and unusual punishment" in the Eighth Amendment to the U.S. Constitution. These court decisions have been the subject of considerable controversy.

Debates 
Increased use of the life imprisonment sentence, especially life without parole, came in response to debates on capital punishment. In fact, many politicians, especially in the Democratic Party, expressed their emphasis on replacing the death penalty with life without parole. Additionally, seeking the death penalty is more costly to the state and taxpayer than seeking life without parole.

A common argument against life without parole is that it is equally as immoral as the death penalty, as it still sentences one to die in prison. Certain organizations and campaigns have been founded with a goal to work against life imprisonment and improve the rate of release. For example, the #DropLWOP campaign is dedicated to dropping the life without parole sentence and providing an automatic commutation and chance to see a parole board for all prisoners serving life sentences.

Notable examples

 Robert Bales - Soldier convicted of murdering 16 civilians in Afghanistan.
 Robert Berdella - A serial killer who kidnapped, raped, tortured, and murdered at least six men.
 John Gotti – Boss of the New York City Gambino crime family.
 Aaron Hernandez – Former NFL Player for the New England Patriots who was found guilty of first-degree murder. Died by suicide on April 19, 2017.
 James Holmes – Perpetrator of the 2012 Aurora, Colorado shooting.
 Lawrence Horn – Former record producer who contracted the killing of his ex-wife, his disabled son, and the son’s nurse in an attempt to gain control of his son's $1.7 million trust fund.
 Ted Kaczynski – The Unabomber, whose homemade bombs killed 3 people and injured 23 others.
 Samuel Little - A serial killer who murdered 50 women across several states.
 Terry Nichols – Main accomplice to Timothy McVeigh in the Oklahoma City bombing in 1995.
 Gary Ridgway – A serial killer who murdered 49 women in and around Seattle.
 Lawrence Rivera – Captured after a 9-year international manhunt and convicted for the murder of Kristina Garcia
 Eric Rudolph – 1996 Olympic bomber, who killed 4 and injured 111 others.
 Faisal Shahzad – The Times Square Bomber, who attempted to detonate a car bomb in Times Square.
 Umar Farouk Abdulmutallab – The "Underwear Bomber", explosives hidden in his underwear while on a flight.
 Ross Ulbricht – Creator and operator of Silk Road, an online black market; convicted of money laundering, computer hacking, and conspiracy to traffic narcotics.
 Ramzi Yousef – Member of Al-Qaeda, who blew up the World Trade Center in 1993. 
 Warren Jeffs – Leader of the FLDS and convicted pedophile, who married child brides, raped two girls, and called himself Immanuel while he practiced polygamy.
 Joaquín "El Chapo" Guzmán – Disposed leader of the Sinaloa Cartel, who broke out of two Mexican jails and went on the run for over a decade until he was caught in 2016 during Operation Black Swan. 
 Robert Hanssen - Former FBI agent, who sold state secrets to the KGB, and The Kremlin.  
 Mark David Chapman - A killer who murdered John Lennon. 
 Richard Reid – The Shoe Bomber, threatened to blow up an airliner by placing C4 explosives in his shoes. 
Nikolas Cruz, the 19-year-old convicted murderer who received 34 life terms for a school shooting case that killed 17 people and injured another 17.
Wadih el-Hage – Member of Al-Qaeda who blew up the US Embassies in Africa and for being Bin Laden's secretary.

Minors
 Alex Baranyi and David Anderson - Murdered four people in one day.
 Scott Dyleski - Murderer of Daniel Horowitz wife Pamela Vitale.
 Rod Ferrell - Cult leader and convicted of murder of two people he committed at age 16.
 Bryan and David Freeman - Murdered their parents and younger brother.
 Terrance Graham - Convicted of a parole violation he committed at age 17.
 Brett Jones - Convicted of the murder of his grandfather committed at age 15.
 Alec Devon Kreider - Murdered his high school friend and his friend's parents.		
 Terrance Graham - Convicted of a parole violation he committed at age 17.
 Warren Harris - A serial killer who murdered four men in New Orleans' French Quarter from February to April 1977.
 Joe Ligon - Convicted of participating in a stabbing spree at age 15 that resulted in one person being killed.
 Nicholas Lindsey - Murderer of a police officer.
 Lee Boyd Malvo - A serial killer convicted in connection with the Beltway sniper attacks in the Washington Metropolitan Area over a three-week period in October 2002. 
 Evan Miller - Convicted of a murder committed at age 14 which resulted in end to automatic life without parole sentences for juveniles.
 Henry Montgomery - Convicted of a murder committed at age 17 which eventually resulted in the end to automatic life without parole sentences for juveniles retroactively.	
 Josh Phillips - Convicted of the murder of 8-year-old Maddie Clifton which he committed at age 14.
 Courtney Schulhoff - Murdered her father at age 16.
 Christopher Simmons - Convicted of a murder  committed at age 17 which resulted in end to Capital punishment for juveniles.
 Lionel Tate - Convicted of the murder of 6-year-old Tiffany Eunick which he committed at age 12, making him the youngest person in U.S. history to be sentenced to life without parole.

See also
Whole life tariff, a determinate life sentence sometimes handed down under English criminal law
Black site

References

United States
United States sentencing law
Imprisonment and detention in the United States